The Oppo Reno 8, is an Android smartphone by Oppo. The phone was announced on 18 July 2022 and was released on 21 July 2022.

About

Display
The Oppo Reno 8 features a 6.4 inch AMOLED display. The 8-bit display is capable of producing up to 16.78 million colors. The display supports HDR10+ hi-res video streaming on most of OTT platforms and 4K streaming on YouTube.

Performance and Benchmark 
OPPO Reno8 5G is powered by the MediaTek Dimensity 1300 MT6893Z. It is an octa-core processor. It shows overall AnTuTu score of 607,013. The OPPO Reno8 5G shows Geekbench multi-core score of 2,365 and single-core score of 493.

References

Smartphones
Oppo smartphones